Natalia Nikolaevna Pichuzhkina (born 3 June 1991 in Zavolzhye, Nizhny Novgorod Oblast) is a Russian group rhythmic gymnast.

Career 
Pichuzkina debuted in international junior scene in 2004 and competed in international competitions along with teammate Evgenia Kanaeva. She won gold medals in team and clubs at the 2006 European Junior Championships.

In 2009, Pichuzkina switched to group rhythmic gymnastics. She competed in her first Worlds at the 2009 World Championships in Mie, Japan where the Russian group won bronze in group all-around and 3 Ribbons + 2 Ropes, they won gold in 5 hoops. The following year they swept the gold medals at the 2010 European Championships in group all-around, 5 hoops, 3 ribbons/ 2 ropes. They repeated as bronze medalists in group all-around at the 2010 World Championships in Moscow, however they won gold in the 5 hoops, 3 ribbons/ 2 ropes finals.

At the 2011 World Rhythmic Gymnastics Championships, Pichuzkina together with the Russian group won the gold medal in 5 balls event and a silver medal in the group all-around event. In 2012, she suffered a leg injury and was replaced by Russian Group reserve member Karolina Sevastyanova to compete at the 2012 European Championships.

Personal life 
Pichuzkina graduated from the Faculty of Physical Education and Sports of Lobachevsky State University of Nizhni Novgorod in 2013.

References

External links
 
 RhythmicGymnasticsResults.com

1991 births
Living people
Russian rhythmic gymnasts
Place of birth missing (living people)
People from Zavolzhye, Nizhny Novgorod Oblast
Medalists at the Rhythmic Gymnastics World Championships
Medalists at the Rhythmic Gymnastics European Championships
Sportspeople from Nizhny Novgorod Oblast